Sir Julian Murray Lewis (born 26 September 1951) is a British Conservative Party politician serving as the Member of Parliament (MP), representing New Forest East since 1997. Lewis has served as Chair of the Intelligence and Security Committee since 2020, succeeding Dominic Grieve.

Lewis served as Chair of the Defence Select Committee from 2015 to 2019. He actively pursues the retention and renewal of the British strategic nuclear deterrent, the UK Trident programme – confirmed in 2016 – and campaigns for Defence expenditure to be restored to 3% of GDP. Lewis had the Conservative Party whip removed after successfully standing against the Government's preferred candidate for the  chairmanship of the Intelligence and Security Committee, former Secretary of State for Transport Chris Grayling, on 15 July 2020. The whip was restored on 30 December 2020.

A Eurosceptic, Lewis is a supporter of the pro-Brexit groups Leave Means Leave and the European Research Group (ERG). He was one of just 28 Conservative MPs (the 'Spartans') who voted all three times against Theresa May's EU Withdrawal Agreement, regarding it as "Brexit in Name Only".

Education, activism and early career
Born in Swansea, into a Jewish family and son of a tailor and designer, Lewis was educated at Dynevor Grammar School and then at Balliol College, Oxford, receiving a BA, later promoted to MA, in Philosophy and Politics. He studied as a postgraduate at St Antony's College, Oxford, being awarded the DPhil in Strategic Studies for his thesis on "British Military Planning for Post War Strategic Defence, 1942-1947" in 1981.

Militant Tendency infiltration of Labour
From 1976 until early 1978, with secret funding from The Freedom Association, he posed as a Labour Party moderate and briefly won control of Newham North East Constituency Labour Party, in an eventually unsuccessful attempt to reverse the deselection of the sitting MP, Reg Prentice, and in order to highlight Militant Tendency entryism in the Labour Party. Prentice himself later joined the Conservatives.

At the end of the Newham campaign, in 1978, Lewis returned to his DPhil studies and joined the London Division of the Royal Naval Reserve, at HMS President, serving as a Seaman on the Southampton-based Ton-class minesweeper, .

Combating CND
Lewis was a leading opponent of the Campaign for Nuclear Disarmament, and other Left-wing organisations, throughout the 1980s. From 1981 to 1985, he was Research Director and then a Director of the Coalition for Peace through Security, set up to support the replacement of Polaris by Trident and the deployment of NATO cruise missiles at RAF Greenham Common and RAF Molesworth, to counter the Soviet SS-20 missiles. This helped the achievement of President Reagan's 1981 Zero Option proposal in the form of the 1987 Intermediate-Range Nuclear Forces Treaty.

Changing legislation and Conservative Research Department
From the mid-1980s, Lewis was also Director of Policy Research Associates, working with Conservative and Crossbench members of the House of Lords to initiate changes to legislation (1) requiring postal ballots for trade union elections (incorporated in the 1984 Trade Union Act and 1988 Employment Act); (2) outlawing political indoctrination in schools (incorporated in the 1986 Education Act and carried forward in the 1996 Education Act); (3) prohibiting local councils from publishing material which "promotes or opposes a point of view on a question of political controversy which is identifiable as the view of one political party and not of another" (incorporated in Section 27 of the 1988 Local Government Act); and (4) more strictly defining the concept of 'due impartiality' in the coverage of politically contentious issues on television and radio (incorporated in the 1990 Broadcasting Act).

With fellow Conservative John Bercow – later elected Speaker of the House of Commons – he ran an Advanced Speaking and Campaigning course for more than ten years, which trained more than 600 Conservatives (including several current MPs) in campaigning and communication techniques.

From 1990 until 1996, Lewis was a Deputy Director of the Conservative Research Department at Conservative Central Office (CCO). In the run-up to the 1992 General Election, CCO published detailed directories compiled by Lewis listing Labour MPs' and candidates' support for Left-wing causes. He continued in this role after his selection in February 1996 as prospective Parliamentary candidate for the new constituency of New Forest East, but in December of that year he resigned from CCO to campaign against Britain joining the single European currency. Only later did opposition to adopting the Euro become official Conservative policy.

In a lecture to former Dynevor School pupils in May 2017, Lewis set out details of his background, his path into politics and his overall conclusions about Parliamentary life.

Parliamentary career
He contested Swansea West at the 1983 general election. As MP for New Forest East, he successfully opposed the development of a large container port at Dibden Bay, between Marchwood and Hythe, and waged other high-profile local campaigns. In Parliament, he was a Shadow Defence Minister from 2002 to 2004 and from 2005 to 2010, also serving as Shadow Minister for the Cabinet Office from 2004 to 2005, and as an Opposition Whip from 2001 to 2002. Before joining the Front Bench, he was a Member of the Defence Select Committee and the Welsh Select Committee, and had also been elected to the Executive of the Conservative Party's 1922 Committee.

With the creation of the Liberal-Conservative Coalition as a result of the election of a hung parliament in 2010, the post which he had shadowed (Minister for the Armed Forces) was allocated to the Liberal Democrat Defence spokesman, Nick Harvey MP. Lewis was appointed as a member of Parliament's Intelligence and Security Committee in September 2010. He has also been a Vice-Chairman of the Conservative Friends of Poland.

Julian Lewis has been described by The Daily Telegraph as "one of the most vigorous rightwingers in the Commons" and by The Guardian as the Conservative Party's "front bench terrier". He was one of the Frontbenchers & Backbenchers of the Year chosen by commentators on the ConservativeHome website, in December 2009 and December 2010 respectively.

His constituency casework has always been carried out by correspondence, telephone and surgery appointments, but not by e-mail, which he describes as "inefficient, insecure and open to abuse".

In May 2014, he was one of eight candidates for the chairmanship of the House of Commons Defence Select Committee, coming second with 212 votes to the eventual winner's 226. Lewis had been in the lead in four of the seven stages of this Alternative Vote election. He was elected as a member of the Defence Select Committee at a by-election in October 2014, whilst remaining on the Intelligence and Security Committee of Parliament.

In March 2015, he was appointed to the Privy Council of the United Kingdom and therefore granted the style The Right Honourable.

In June 2015, he was elected to the Chair of the Commons Defence Select Committee by 314 votes to 242, and in July 2017 he was re-elected to this position, in the new Parliament, by 305 votes to 265. Having supervised more than 30 Inquiries, during the 2015–17 and 2017–19 Parliaments, Lewis made it known in January 2020 that he would not seek re-election to chair the Defence Committee for a third time, as "It is better to stop while people wish you to carry on, than to carry on until people wish you to stop!"

Privacy of MPs' home addresses
From May to July 2008, Lewis initiated and organised the  successful campaign to change the Freedom of Information Act in order that a High Court ruling, obtained by a journalist on The Sunday Telegraph, that 14 MPs' home addresses should be published, could never be repeated in respect of any other Parliamentarians. More than 250 backbenchers from all parties, as well as members of the Government and the Shadow Cabinet, supported this campaign.

In March 2009, his amendment to the Political Parties and Elections Bill was carried by a  majority of 59. It removed the requirement for general election candidates to disclose their home addresses on nomination and ballot papers, and was upheld by a  majority of 72 when the Bill went through the House of Lords in July 2009. In both Houses, Labour and Conservatives were granted Free Votes on the Lewis Amendment, and Liberal Democrats were whipped to vote against it.

Finally, in March 2018, in its response to Intimidation in Public Life: a Review by the Committee on Standards in Public Life, the Government additionally accepted the committee's recommendation that it should "bring forward legislation to remove the requirement for candidates standing as local councillors to have their home addresses published on the ballot paper". That requirement would be replaced by "an option to include a statement of residence based on an electoral area the candidate lives in rather than having to include a specific address".

Expenses
Although Julian Lewis was repeatedly listed as amongst the lowest-claiming MPs (ranked 566th out of 647 in 2008/09), The Sunday Telegraph alleged in May 2009 that he had tried to claim the £6,000 cost of a wooden floor in his second home. He maintained that: "At no stage did I claim for the flooring and it did not cost the taxpayer a penny." A senior Commons official confirmed that, by seeking advice in advance about second home expenditure, he had acted "in accordance with best practice as recommended by this department" and that "it is not true that you attempted to claim £6,000 in expenses for a wooden floor at your second home".

Accessibility
Lewis is the only Member of Parliament who does not allow his constituents to contact him by email. In a letter in the Guardian, he stated: "Letters, phone calls, and, where appropriate, surgery appointments are perfectly adequate for people who genuinely need my help, as the many letters of thanks quoted on my website fully confirm. Only mass, manipulative campaigners and obsessive individuals find this a problem – and so they should!"

Selected political issues
In November 2007, Lewis resigned his life membership of the Oxford Union debating society, after 37 years, in protest at its decision to invite Holocaust denier David Irving and Nick Griffin, the leader of the British National Party, to be speakers at one of its events.

In April 2010, he was asked why he had opposed lowering the age of consent for homosexual relationships, eleven years earlier, in 1999. He stated that this had been because of his belief that the decision to incur any extra risk of contracting HIV should be taken on reaching the current age of majority, namely 18. He added that he had twice voted voluntarily in favour of the Civil Partnership Bill – at Second and Third Readings, on 12 October and 9 November 2004, respectively.

In December 2010, he attacked, and was one of six Conservative MPs who voted against Coalition proposals to increase student tuition fees from a maximum of £3,000 to a maximum of £9,000 per year, on the grounds that this would deter the less well-off from going to university.

In February 2011, he strongly opposed, and was one of three Conservative MPs who voted against, Coalition plans to transfer heritage forests from public ownership to trusts. The plans were later disowned by the Government and abandoned.

In October 2011, he was one of 81 Conservative rebels who voted in favour of a referendum on the UK's membership of the European Union and, in October 2012, he was one of 53 Conservative rebels voting to demand a real-terms cut in the EU budget. Both policies were later adopted by the party leadership.

In July 2012, he was one of 91 Conservatives who successfully blocked Coalition plans to replace the House of Lords with a second chamber of party politicians elected by proportional representation.

In January 2013, with the assistance of MPs from both sides of the nuclear weapons argument, Lewis secured and introduced the first debate in the Commons chamber on Trident since the vote to approve its retention and renewal in March 2007.

From May 2013 onwards, he strongly opposed arming the rebels in the Syrian civil war, arguing that Assad's chemical weapons would pose a deadly threat to the West if they fell into the hands of jihadists fighting on the side of the opposition. On 29 August, the Coalition Government's motion in support of the principle of military intervention was defeated by just 13 votes. Julian Lewis spoke and voted against the Government's motion.

In November 2013, Lewis was one of 16 Eurosceptic Conservative MPs to support an amendment to the European Union (Referendum) Bill, which – if carried – would have required an "in/out" referendum to be held before, rather than after, the scheduled 2015 general election; and in November 2014 he was one of only 28 Eurosceptic Conservative MPs to vote against the UK opting to rejoin the European Arrest Warrant regime.

In November and December 2015, before and during the debate on bombing ISIL/Daesh in Syria, Lewis challenged David Cameron's claim that there were 70,000 "moderate" Syrian fighters opposing ISIL/Daesh, describing the figure as "magical" and quoting expert commentators' views that the "Free Syrian Army" contained many Islamists. In the Commons debate on 2 December, Lewis stated that "instead of having dodgy dossiers [as in the 2003 Iraq conflict], we now have bogus battalions of moderate fighters". He predicted that "Once Daesh has been driven out, ... an Occupying Power will have to remain in control for many years to come ... and only the Syrian Government Army is likely to provide it. ... Airstrikes alone are a dangerous diversion and distraction. What is needed is a grand military alliance involving not only the West but Russia and, yes, its Syrian Government clients too. ... We need to choose the lesser of two evils and abandon the fiction of a cosy third choice" between "very nasty authoritarians and Islamist totalitarians". After making this widely reported speech, Lewis voted against extending airstrikes against ISIL/Daesh into Syria in the absence of "credible ground forces", and he continued to maintain that, apart from the Kurdish-led forces, in Syria the choice remained "between monsters on the one hand, and maniacs on the other".

In February 2016, at the start of the referendum campaign on British membership of the European Union, Lewis set out his six main reasons for voting to leave, and in the main Commons debate on whether to trigger Article 50, after the Referendum vote to leave, his entire speech consisted of just 17 words: "Thank you, Mr Speaker. In my opinion, the people have decided, and I'm going to vote accordingly".

In January 2017, in a televised Speaker's House lecture, Lewis stated his belief in the unpredictability of future conflicts; the value of nuclear deterrence; and the role of containment in long-term ideological struggles. He called for three per cent of GDP to be spent on Defence, and for a Statute of Limitations to be enacted "covering everything that took place before the Belfast Agreement", in order to protect Service veterans from legal harassment. Lewis also criticised media suggestions that the next NATO Secretary-General should be David Cameron, given his unsatisfactory record of "toppling Arab dictators in places like Libya, increasing military commitments whilst cutting the Armed Forces, predicting a Third World War in consequence of Brexit, [and] dangerously delaying the renewal of Trident for the sake of Coalition politics".

In March 2019, Lewis was one of 21 MPs who voted against compulsory sex and relationship education in English schools, arguing that "in some cases, instead of children getting necessary sex education in schools, more parents are going to keep their children out of school" completely.

In January and March 2019, he was one of only 28 Conservative Eurosceptic MPs – the so-called 'Spartans' – to vote against Theresa May's EU Withdrawal Agreement in all three divisions in the House of Commons, because "Brexit should mean Brexit and no deal is better than this bad deal".

Defence Committee Inquiries
Among notable Inquiry reports
produced under the chairmanship of Julian Lewis have been:

Shifting the Goalposts? Defence Expenditure and the 2% Pledge, published in April 2016, which concluded that the Government had met the minimum 2% NATO guideline only by counting "several significant items not previously included when calculating defence expenditure", although doing so in accordance with NATO rules. The report set out, in detailed Annexes, the decline in UK expenditure on Defence as a proportion of GDP since the mid-1950s in comparison with that on Welfare, Health and Education. It also led to the subsequent adoption by the Defence Committee of a target of 3% of GDP to be spent on Defence, as in the mid-1990s. In July 2019, the Committee published an Update to Shifting the Goalposts?, which confirmed that defence expenditure had declined in successive years to 1.9% (2014–15), then 1.8% (2015–16, 2016–17 and 2017–18), when "calculated on a historically consistent basis". Under the more generous NATO rules, the corresponding figures were 2.2% (2014–15), then 2.1% (2015–16, 2016–17 and 2017–18).

An Acceptable Risk? The Use of Lariam by Military Personnel, published in May 2016, which led to a significant reduction in the use of the anti-malarial drug mefloquine, and to the enforcement of stringent requirements before its prescription, on account of possible severe side-effects in some cases.

UK Military Operations in Syria and Iraq, published in September 2016, which revealed the great disparity between the large number of airstrikes being carried out in Iraq, where the UK was campaigning in support of substantial indigenous government ground forces, and the far lower total undertaken in Syria, where the UK could find only limited ground forces to support.

Open Source Stupidity – The Threat to the BBC Monitoring Service, published in December 2016, which strongly criticised the BBC's plan to close the dedicated headquarters of the Monitoring Service at Caversham Park, condemned the UK Government's previous decision to end its ring-fenced grant for the Service which had led to this outcome, and predicted that a state-owned Open Source Information Agency might eventually have to be established.

Investigations into Fatalities in Northern Ireland involving British Military Personnel, published in April 2017, which recommended the enactment of a Statute of Limitations coupled with a truth-recovery process as the best way to prevent the legal persecution of UK Service, Police and Security Personnel, decades after the events in question, whilst offering the best prospect of finding out what had actually happened during the Troubles.

Sunset for the Royal Marines? The Royal Marines and Amphibious Capability, published in February 2018, which excoriated the heavily trailed suggestion that the amphibious assault ships, HMS Albion and HMS Bulwark, would be removed from the Fleet 15 years early as part of the National Security Capability Review. The report described the proposal as "a short-sighted, militarily illiterate manoeuvre totally at odds with strategic reality". After wide publicity, the plan was abandoned and the capability was saved.

Rash or Rational? North Korea and the Threat it Poses, published in April 2018, which concluded that Kim Jong-un is "ruthless, like other Communist dictators before him, but he is rational" and can be "dissuaded from the use of nuclear weapons by means of a policy of deterrence and containment" though "unlikely to give them up now".

Lost in Translation? Afghan Interpreters and other Locally Employed Civilians, published in May 2018, which recommended "a looser and more sympathetic approach" to admitting threatened interpreters to the UK, given that it "is impossible to reconcile the generosity of the Redundancy Scheme with the utter failure of the Intimidation Scheme to relocate even a single LEC to the United Kingdom". Subsequently, some liberalisation of the rules for relocation to the UK was introduced.

Beyond 2 per cent: A Preliminary Report on the Modernising Defence Programme, published in June 2018, which backed the removal of Defence from the "fiscally neutral" National Security Capability Review process – with its threats to impose further cuts on the Armed Forces, such as the deletion of the amphibious assault ships. The report recommended a financial settlement "based on a level of Defence expenditure approaching the figure of 3% of GDP", which would demonstrate that the mantra "Defence is the first duty of Government" could finally be believed.

Defence Committee innovations
As well as those carried out by the full Defence Committee under his chairmanship, in 2015 Lewis initiated an arrangement for the Defence Sub-Committee to undertake separate individual inquiries chaired in turn by other members of the Defence Committee. Between 2016 and 2018 the Sub-Committee produced reports on military exercise deaths, the Iraq Historic Allegations Team and Defence in the Arctic.

In February 2018, Julian Lewis and his French counterpart Jean-Jacques Bridey agreed to launch a joint Inquiry by their respective committees into the UK-France future cruise/anti-ship weapon project. It was the first joint Inquiry to be held by a House of Commons Committee and a Committee of a non-UK legislature and reported in December 2018.

Intelligence and Security Committee
On 15 July 2020, Lewis was elected Chair of the Intelligence and Security Committee of Parliament (ISC) with the support of the opposition MPs on the committee. He defeated Chris Grayling, who had been the Government's preferred candidate. Lewis had the Conservative Party whip removed later that day for what a government source described as "working with Labour and other opposition MPs for his own advantage"; but Lewis stated that he had never responded to government whips about how he would vote, because he considered it an "improper request" as the 2013 Justice and Security Act explicitly removed the Prime Minister's right to choose the committee chair: "At no earlier stage did I give any undertaking to vote for any particular candidate". Although, the following day, the Leader of the House, Jacob Rees-Mogg, said he would not rule out a plot to remove Lewis from the ISC, the government took no further action against him and restored the Conservative Party whip to him unconditionally on 30 December 2020.

Military writings and honorary academic posts
A second edition of his 1988 book Changing Direction: British Military Planning for Post-war Strategic Defence, 1942–1947 was published in 2003 and a university paperback edition in 2008. It was described by Professor Richard Aldrich, in the Journal of Cold War Studies, as "an indispensable guide to some of the most fascinating and secretive aspects of early Cold War history" and "one of the few books to penetrate the wall of secrecy that existed in the 1980s".

His essay on  Nuclear Disarmament versus Peace in the 21st Century won the Trench Gascoigne Prize of the Royal United Services Institute for Defence and Security Studies (RUSI) in 2005. Two years later, 
Lewis won this prize for a second time, with an essay entitled Double-I, Double-N: A Framework for Counter-Insurgency.

His 10,000-word dissertation on The Future of the British Nuclear Deterrent was selected for an award and for publication as a Seaford House Paper by the Royal College of Defence Studies of which he was a Parliamentary member in 2006.

In February 2009, the RUSI Journal published Soldiers against the Bomb? – his essay detailing the principal military and political arguments for retaining the UK nuclear deterrent, in response to a letter in The Times by three retired Generals.

Also published in 2009, was a commentary by Lewis written as the foreword to a translation and analysis, by US military academic Dr Norman Cigar, of an Al-Qaida terrorist's handbook.

Lewis's own most recent book, published in 2011, is a military biography Racing Ace – The Fights and Flights of "Kink" Kinkead DSO DSC* DFC*, published in 2011, recounting the adventurous life of a pioneering airman whose grave he found in his constituency. In choosing it as a 'Book of the Year 2011' for The Sunday Telegraph Magazine, historian Andrew Roberts described Samuel Kinkead as "one of the bravest airmen of the 20th century", and Racing Ace as "exactly what an action biography should be".

Lewis's critique of strategy in Afghanistan International Terrorism – The Case for Containment  was published in the US military journal  Joint Force Quarterly in April 2012. In December that year, the RUSI Journal published his review article on the ideological fight against Islamist extremism, entitled Countering Terrorism is not Enough.

The dangers of another Middle Eastern military intervention – to help overthrow Assad in Syria – were spelt out by Lewis on the ConservativeHome website in June 2013.

In May 2014, the RUSI Journal published The Slow Boat to Unilateralism, an analysis by Lewis of Liberal Democrat policy on the British strategic nuclear deterrent after the completion of the Trident Alternatives Review.

As part of the events marking the centenary of World War I, he delivered a lecture on Politics and the First World War in May 2015, and in November that year, together with fellow MP Adam Holloway, he wrote to all members of the House of Commons welcoming the proposal to bomb ISIL/DAESH – rather than the Syrian Government forces – as a "step in the right direction", but opposing any air campaign in the absence of a realistic strategy on the ground.

During the EU Referendum campaign, in May 2016, The Daily Telegraph published an 'op-ed' article by Lewis arguing that Far from Keeping Britain Safe, the EU is a Threat to Peace, and in January 2017 he delivered the first in that year's Speaker's Lecture series with a presentation on The Future of the Armed Forces.

In 2010, Lewis was appointed as a Visiting Senior Research Fellow, Centre for Defence Studies, Department of War Studies, King's College, London; and, in 2019, he became an Honorary Professor, Strategy and Security Institute, University of Exeter.

Honours
Lewis was knighted in the 2023 New Year Honours for political and public service.

See also
 List of parliamentary constituencies in Hampshire

Notes

References

External links
 Julian Lewis MP biography at the site of the Conservative Party
 

1951 births
Military personnel from Swansea
Living people
Politicians from Swansea
Conservative Party (UK) MPs for English constituencies
British Jews
British people of Welsh descent
UK MPs 1997–2001
UK MPs 2001–2005
UK MPs 2005–2010
UK MPs 2010–2015
UK MPs 2015–2017
UK MPs 2017–2019
UK MPs 2019–present
People educated at Dynevor School, Swansea
Alumni of Balliol College, Oxford
Alumni of St Antony's College, Oxford
Knights Bachelor
Politicians awarded knighthoods
Members of the Privy Council of the United Kingdom
Jewish British politicians
Royal Naval Volunteer Reserve personnel
Royal Navy sailors
Politicians affected by a party expulsion process
Royal Naval Reserve personnel
Independent members of the House of Commons of the United Kingdom